Symphony No. 19 in E-flat major, K. 132, is a symphony composed by Wolfgang Amadeus Mozart in July 1772.

Structure 
The symphony is scored for two oboes, four horns (two of them uniquely written in E-flat alto), and strings.

There are four movements:

Allegro, 
Andante, 
Menuetto – Trio, 
Allegro, 

The first movement opens with a motif that Mozart would later use at the beginning of his twenty-second piano concerto in the same key.  The exposition is brief and there is no repeat.  The development focuses on new material.

There is also an alternative slow movement, marked Andantino grazioso. The tempo marks in the first, second and fourth movements were written in the hand of Leopold Mozart.

The finale is a French rondo in seven-part form (ABACADA). Each part of the rondo is repeated except for the final A.

References

External links
, first movement recordings

19
1772 compositions
Compositions in E-flat major